Bishunpur is a village in the Bishunpur CD block in the Gumla subdivision of the Gumla district in the Indian state of Jharkhand.

Geography

Location
Bishunpur is located at 

Bishunpur is 51 km west of Lohardaga on the Ranchi- Netarhat road.

Area overview
The map alongside presents a rugged area, consisting partly of flat-topped hills called pat and partly of an undulating plateau, in the south-western portion of Chota Nagpur Plateau. Three major rivers – the Sankh, South Koel and North Karo - along with their numerous tributaries, drain the area. The hilly area has large deposits of Bauxite. 93.7% of the population lives in rural areas.

Note: The map alongside presents some of the notable locations in the district. All places marked in the map are linked in the larger full screen map.

Civic administration
There is a police station at Bishunpur.

The headquarters of Bishunpur CD block are located at Bishunpur village.

Demographics
According to the 2011 Census of India, Bishunpur had a total population of 1,309, of which 652 (50%) were males and 657 (50%) were females. Population in the age range 0–6 years was 181. The total number of literate persons in Bishunpur was 897 (79.52% of the population over 6 years).

(*For language details see Bishunpur block#Language and religion)

Education
S.S. High School Bishunpur is a Hindi-medium coeducational institution established in 1957. It has facilities for teaching from class VII to class XII. It has a playground and a library with 500 books.

Kasturba Gandhi Balika Vidyalaya is a Hindi-medium girls only institution established in 2007. It has facilities for teaching from class VI to class XII. The school has a playground, a library with 328 books and has 9 computers for learning and teaching purposes.

Project Girls High School is a Hindi-medium girls only institution established in 1981. It has facilities for teaching in classes IX and X. The school has a library with 252 books.

References

Villages in Gumla district